Bustards, including floricans and korhaans, are large, terrestrial birds living mainly in dry grassland areas and on the steppes of the Old World. They make up the family Otididae (formerly known as Otidae).

Bustards are omnivorous and opportunistic, eating leaves, buds, seeds, fruit, small vertebrates, and invertebrates. There are 26 species currently recognised.

Etymology 
The word bustard comes from the Old French bistarda and some other languages: abetarda (pt), abetarda (gl), avutarda (es) used for the great bustard. The naturalist William Turner listed the English spelling "bustard" and "bistard" in 1544.

All of the common names above are derived from Latin avis tarda or aves tardas given by Pliny the Elder, these names were mentioned by the Pierre Belon in 1555 and  Ulisse Aldrovandi in 1600. The word tarda comes from tardus in Latin meaning "slow" and "deliberate", which is apt to describe the typical walking style of the species.

Taxonomy 
The family Otididae was introduced (as Otidia) by the French polymath Constantine Samuel Rafinesque in 1815. Otididae and before that Otidae come from the genus Otis given to the great bustard by the Swedish naturalist Carl Linnaeus in the tenth edition of his Systema Naturae in 1758, it comes from the Greek word  ōtis. 

Family Otididae
 Genus †Gryzaja Zubareva 1939
 †Gryzaja odessana Zubareva 1939
 Genus †Ioriotis Burchak-Abramovich & Vekua 1981
 †Ioriotis gabunii Burchak-Abramovich & Vekua 1981
 Genus †Miootis Umanskaya 1979
 †Miootis compactus Umanskaya 1979
 Genus †Pleotis Hou 1982
 †Pleotis liui Hou 1982
 Subfamily Lissotinae Verheyen 1957 non Benesh 1955
 Genus Lissotis Reichenbach 1848
 Hartlaub's bustard, Lissotis hartlaubii (Heuglin 1863)
 Black-bellied bustard, Lissotis melanogaster (Rüppell 1835)
 L. m. notophila Oberholser 1905
 L. m. melanogaster (Rüppell 1835)
 Subfamily Neotinae Verheyen 1957
 Genus Neotis Sharpe 1893
 Nubian bustard, Neotis nuba 
 Ludwig's bustard, Neotis ludwigii 
 Denham's bustard, Neotis denhami 
 N. d. denhami (Denham's bustard)
 N. d. jacksoni (Jackson's bustard)
 N. d. stanleyi (Stanley bustard)
 Heuglin's bustard, Neotis heuglinii 
 Genus Ardeotis Le Maout 1853
 Arabian bustard, Ardeotis arabs (Linnaeus 1758) 
 A. a. lynesi (Bannerman 1930) (Moroccan bustard)
 A. a. stieberi (Neumann 1907) (great Arabian bustard)
 A. a. arabs (Linnaeus 1758)
 A. a. butleri (Bannerman 1930) (Sudan bustard)
 Australian bustard, Ardeotis australis (Gray 1829) 
 Great Indian bustard, Ardeotis nigriceps (Vigors 1831)
 Kori bustard, Ardeotis kori (Burchell 1822) 
 A. k. struthiunculus (Neumann 1907) (Northern Kori bustard)
 A. k. kori (Burchell 1822) (Southern Kori bustard)
 Subfamily Otidinae Gray 1841
 Genus Tetrax Forster 1817
 †T. paratetrax (Bocheński & Kuročkin 1987)
 Little bustard, Tetrax tetrax (Linnaeus 1758) Forster 1817
 Genus Otis Linnaeus 1758
  †O. bessarabicus Kessler & Gal 1996
  †O. hellenica Boev, Lazaridis & Tsoukala 2014
 Great bustard, Otis tarda Linnaeus 1758 
 O. t. tarda Linnaeus 1758 (Western great bustard)
 O. t. dybowskii Taczanowski 1874 (Eastern great bustard)
 Genus Chlamydotis Lesson 1839
  †C. affinis (Lydekker 1891a) Brodkorb 1967
  †C. mesetaria Sánchez Marco 1990
 Macqueen's bustard, Chlamydotis macqueenii (Gray 1832)
 Houbara bustard, Chlamydotis undulata (Jacquin 1784) 
 C. u. fuertaventurae (Rothschild & Hartert 1894) (Canary Islands houbara bustard)
 C. u. undulata (Jacquin 1784) (North African houbara bustard)
 Genus Houbaropsis Sharpe 1893
 Bengal florican, Houbaropsis bengalensis (Statius Müller 1776) Sharpe 1893
 H. b. bengalensis (Statius Müller 1776) Sharpe 1893
 H. b. blandini Delacour 1928
 Genus Sypheotides Lesson 1839
 Lesser florican, Sypheotides indicus (Miller 1782) Lesson 1839 
 Genus Lophotis Reichenbach 1848
 Red-crested korhaan, Lophotis ruficrista (Smith 1836)
 Savile's bustard, Lophotis savilei Lynes 1920 
 Buff-crested bustard, Lophotis gindiana (Oustalet 1881)
 Genus Eupodotis Lesson 1839
 Little brown bustard, Eupodotis humilis (Blyth 1855)
 Karoo korhaan, Eupodotis vigorsii (Smith 1831)
 E. v. namaqua (Roberts 1932)
 E. v. vigorsii (Smith 1831)
 Rüppell's korhaan, Eupodotis rueppellii (Wahlberg 1856)
 E. r. fitzsimonsi (Roberts 1937)
 E. r. rueppellii (Wahlberg 1856)
 Blue korhaan, Eupodotis caerulescens (Vieillot 1820)
 White-bellied bustard, Eupodotis senegalensis (Vieillot 1821)
 E. s. barrowii (Gray 1829) (Barrow's/southern white-bellied Bustard)
 E. s. canicollis (Reichenow 1881) (Somali white-bellied knorhaan)
 E. s. erlangeri (Reichenow 1905)
 E. s. mackenziei White 1945
 E. s. senegalensis (Vieillot 1821) (Senegal bustard)
 Genus Afrotis Gray 1855
 Southern black korhaan, Afrotis afra (Linnaeus 1758)
 Northern black korhaan, Afrotis afraoides (Smith 1831)
 A. a. etoschae (Grote 1922)
 A. a. damarensis Roberts 1926
 A. a. afraoides (Smith 1831)

Description 
Bustards are all fairly large with the two largest species, the kori bustard (Ardeotis kori) and the great bustard (Otis tarda), being frequently cited as the world's heaviest flying birds. In most bustards, males are substantially larger than females, often about 30% longer and sometimes more than twice the weight. They are among the most sexually dimorphic groups of birds. In only the floricans is the sexual dimorphism the reverse, with the adult female being slightly larger and heavier than the male.

The wings have 10 primaries and 16–24 secondary feathers. There are 18–20 feathers in the tail. The plumage is predominantly cryptic.

Behaviour and ecology 
Bustards are omnivorous, feeding principally on seeds and invertebrates. They make their nests on the ground, making their eggs and offspring often very vulnerable to predation. They walk steadily on strong legs and big toes, pecking for food as they go. Most prefer to run or walk over flying. They have long broad wings with "fingered" wingtips, and striking patterns in flight. Many have interesting mating displays, such as inflating throat sacs or elevating elaborate feathered crests. The female lays three to five dark, speckled eggs in a scrape in the ground, and incubates them alone.

Evolution 
Genetic dating indicates that bustards evolved  30 million years ago in either southern or eastern Africa from where they dispersed into Eurasia and Australia.

Status and conservation 

Bustards are gregarious outside the breeding season, but are very wary and difficult to approach in the open habitats they prefer.
Most species are declining or endangered through habitat loss and hunting, even where they are nominally protected.

United Kingdom 
The birds were once common and abounded on the Salisbury Plain. They had become rare by 1819 when a large male, surprised by a dog on Newmarket Heath, sold in Leadenhall Market for five guineas. The last bustard in Britain died in approximately 1832, but the bird is being reintroduced through batches of chicks imported from Russia.
In 2009, two great bustard chicks were hatched in Britain for the first time in more than 170 years. Reintroduced bustards also hatched chicks in 2010.

Floricans
Some Indian bustards are also called Floricans. The origin of the name is unclear. Thomas C. Jerdon writes in The Birds of India (1862)

The Hobson-Jobson dictionary, however, casts doubt on this theory stating that

 Notes 

 References 

 Bota, Gerard, et al. Ecology and conservation of Steppe-Land birds''. International Symposium on Ecology and Conservation of Steppe-land birds. Lynx Edicions 2005. 343 pages. .

External links

Bustard videos on the Internet Bird Collection

Extant Miocene first appearances

Serravallian first appearances
Taxa named by Constantine Samuel Rafinesque